Alphonse Huylebroeck (7 July 1910 – 1990) was a Belgian sculptor. His work was part of the sculpture event in the art competition at the 1936 Summer Olympics.

References

1910 births
1990 deaths
20th-century Belgian sculptors
20th-century male artists
Belgian sculptors
Olympic competitors in art competitions
People from Aalst, Belgium